Niall Evalds (born 26 August 1993) is an English professional rugby league footballer who plays as a  for the Castleford Tigers in the Super League and the England Knights and England at international level.

He has previously played for the Salford Red Devils in the Super League, where he holds the club record for most Super League tries. He has spent time on loan from Salford at Oldham in the Championship 1 and at the Barrow Raiders in the Championship, and on dual registration from Salford at Halifax in the Championship.

Early life
Evalds was born in Halifax, West Yorkshire, England. He is of Latvian descent through his paternal grandfather Jānis ("John"), who settled in Halifax during World War II.

Career

Salford Red Devils 
Evalds made his Super League debut on 9 February 2013 against the Catalans Dragons.

He became Salford Red Devils leading Super League try scorer when he scored his 66th try in the competition against London Broncos in 2019.

He played in the 2019 Super League Grand Final defeat by St. Helens at Old Trafford.

In May 2020, Salford Director Paul King stated that Evalds had rejected the opportunity to extend his contract with the Red Devils into 2021.

On 17 October 2020, he played for Salford in the 2020 Challenge Cup Final which Salford lost 17–16 against Leeds.

Castleford Tigers 
In August 2020, shortly after Super League's resumption following its Covid-19 suspension, it was announced that Evalds had signed a one-year contract with Castleford (Heritage № 1004) for the 2021 season. He said of the move, "This was an opportunity to take up a new challenge at Cas and have to prove myself all over again." Tigers head coach Daryl Powell described Evalds as "a high-quality player with a real instinct for rugby league".

Evalds made his Castleford debut and scored his first try for the club on 28 March 2021 against the Warrington Wolves. In May 2021, he signed a two-year contract extension with the Tigers, with the option of an additional year. On 17 July 2021, Evalds appeared in his second successive Challenge Cup final as Castleford fell to a 12-26 defeat against St Helens. Evalds scored a try for Castleford and, despite being on the losing team, was voted winner of the Lance Todd Trophy for player of the match. He finished the season having made 20 appearances and scored 7 tries.

Castleford's new head coach for the 2022 season, Lee Radford, was impressed by the ability of Evalds; he said, "I had him amongst the elite fullbacks in the competition, but he has probably surpassed that for me." Hamstring and bicep injuries limited Evalds' playtime early in the year, before a shoulder injury sustained while scoring a try against Warrington in July ended his season prematurely.

International career
In July 2018 he was selected in the England Knights Performance squad. Later that year he was selected for the England Knights on their tour of Papua New Guinea. He played in their 12-16 victory against Papua New Guinea at the Lae Football Stadium in Lae.

In 2019 he was selected for the England Knights in their 38-6 victory against Jamaica at Headingley Rugby Stadium.

Evalds earned his first senior England cap in their 30-10 victory over France at the Stade Gilbert Brutus on 23 October 2021.

Statistics

Club career 

(* denotes season still competing)

International career

References

External links

Salford Red Devils profile
SL profile

1993 births
Living people
Barrow Raiders players
Castleford Tigers players
England Knights national rugby league team players
England national rugby league team players
English people of Latvian descent
English rugby league players
Lance Todd Trophy winners
Oldham R.L.F.C. players
Rugby league fullbacks
Rugby league players from Halifax, West Yorkshire
Rugby league wingers
Salford Red Devils players